The 2019 Gran Piemonte was the 103rd edition of the Gran Piemonte (known as Giro del Piemonte until 2009) single-day cycling race. It was held on 10 October, over a distance of 183 km, starting in Agliè and ending in the Sanctuary of Oropa.

Teams
Nineteen teams were invited to take part in the race. These included ten UCI WorldTeams and nine UCI Professional Continental.

Results

References

Gran Piemonte
2019 in Italian sport
Giro del Piemonte